In mathematics, a configuration space is a construction closely related to state spaces or phase spaces in physics. In physics, these are used to describe the state of a whole system as a single point in a high-dimensional space. In mathematics, they are used to describe assignments of a collection of points to positions in a topological space. More specifically, configuration spaces in mathematics are particular examples of configuration spaces in physics in the particular case of several non-colliding particles.

Definition 

For a topological space , the nth (ordered) configuration space of X is the set of n-tuples of pairwise distinct points in :

This space is generally endowed with the subspace topology from the inclusion of  into .

There is a natural action of the symmetric group  on the points in  given by

 

 

which is the orbit space of that action. The intuition is that this action "forgets the names of the points". The collection of unordered configuration spaces over all  is the Ran space, and comes with a natural topology.

 Alternative formulations 

 

For , define .

Examples 

Connection to braid groups 

The -strand braid group on a connected topological space  is 

The first studied braid groups were the Artin braid groups . While the above definition is not the one that Emil Artin gave, Adolf Hurwitz implicitly defined the Artin braid groups as fundamental groups of configuration spaces of the complex plane considerably before Artin's definition (in 1891).

Configuration spaces of manifolds 

The configuration space of distinct unordered points is also a manifold, while the configuration space of not necessarily distinct unordered points is instead an orbifold.

A configuration space is a type of classifying space or (fine) moduli space.  In particular, there is a universal bundle  which is a sub-bundle of the trivial bundle , and which has the property that the fiber over each point  is the n element subset of  classified by p.

Homotopy invariance 
The homotopy type of configuration spaces is not homotopy invariant.

It used to be an open question whether there were examples of compact manifolds which were homotopy equivalent but had non-homotopy equivalent configuration spaces: such an example was found only in 2005 by Riccardo Longoni and Paolo Salvatore. Their example are two three-dimensional lens spaces, and the configuration spaces of at least two points in them. That these configuration spaces are not homotopy equivalent was detected by Massey products in their respective universal covers. Homotopy invariance for configuration spaces of simply connected closed manifolds remains open in general, and has been proved to hold over the base field . Real homotopy invariance of simply connected compact manifolds with simply connected boundary of dimension at least 4 was also proved.

Configuration spaces of graphs 
Some results are particular to configuration spaces of graphs. This problem can be related to robotics and motion planning: one can imagine placing several robots on tracks and trying to navigate them to different positions without collision. The tracks correspond to (the edges of) a graph, the robots correspond to particles, and successful navigation corresponds to a path in the configuration space of that graph.

For any graph ,  is an Eilenberg–MacLane space of type  and strong deformation retracts to a CW complex of dimension , where  is the number of vertices of degree at least 3. Moreover,  and  deformation retract to non-positively curved cubical complexes of dimension at most .

Configuration spaces of mechanical linkages 

One also defines the configuration space of a mechanical linkage with the graph  its underlying geometry. Such a graph is commonly assumed  to be constructed as concatenation of rigid rods and hinges. The configuration space of such a linkage is defined as the totality of all its admissible positions in the Euclidean space equipped with a proper metric. The configuration space of a generic linkage is a smooth manifold, for example, for the trivial planar linkage made of  rigid rods connected with revolute joints, the configuration space is the n-torus .
The simplest singularity point in such configuration spaces is a product of a cone on a homogeneous quadratic hypersurface by a Euclidean space. Such a singularity point emerges for linkages which can be divided into two sub-linkages such that their respective endpoints trace-paths intersect in a non-transverse manner, for example linkage which can be aligned (i.e. completely be folded into a line).

See also

Configuration space (physics)
State space (physics)

References 

Manifolds
Topology
Algebraic topology